Pravin Godkhindi (born 28 October 1973) is an Indian classical Hindustani flute (bansuri) player. He has mastered both the tantrakari and gayaki style of playing on the flute. He was called a top ranking artist in Hindustani bansuri, by Akashvani (AIR).

Biography

	1st Indian flautist to perform on the 8-foot long contrabass flute
	"Top Ranking Artiste" in Hindustani bansuri, by Akashvani (AIR)
	1st Indian to represent bansuri at the World Flute Festival in Mendoza, Argentina
	National awards for films Beru and Vimukthi
	Brand ambassador for AKG microphones
	Started toying with a small flute at the age of 3 years
	First public performance at the age of 6
	Gurus - Pandit Venkatesh Godkhindi & Vidwan Anoor Ananth Krishna Sharma
	Titles: Surmani, Naada-Nidhi, Sur Samrat, Kalapraveena, Aryabhatta, Aasthana Sangeet Vidwan from the Udupi Sri Krishna Mutt
	B.E. - electrical & electronics engineering with distinction from SDMCET, Dharwad.
	Performed with eminent musicians like Ustad Zakir Hussain, Dr. Balmurali Krishna, Pt. Vishwa Mohan Bhatt, Dr. Kadri Gopinath and Sivamani.
 Also started Raagatainment series covering 101 ragas on YouTube.

References

External links
 
 Pravin Godkhindi - Nadatarangini

Hindustani instrumentalists
Bansuri players
Kannada film score composers
People from Dharwad
Living people
Indian male classical musicians
Musicians from Karnataka
Male film score composers
1973 births